Other Sounds (also released as Expression!) is an album by multi-instrumentalist Yusef Lateef recorded in 1957 and released on the New Jazz label.

Reception

The Allmusic review stated: "Other Sounds was the first album on which Yusef Lateef looked beyond the confines of jazz and popular music to hear and perhaps 'sing' the music he heard from the East".

Track listing 
All compositions by Yusef Lateef except as indicated
 "All Alone" (Irving Berlin) - 5:02
 "Anastasia" (Alfred Newman) - 4:12
 "Minor Mood" - 9:32
 "Taboo" (Margarita Lecuona, Bob Russell) - 9:11
 "Lambert's Point" (Wilbur Harden) - 4:41
 "Mahaba" - 3:44

Personnel 
Yusef Lateef - tenor saxophone, flute, tambourine, argol
Wilbur Harden - flugelhorn, balloon
Hugh Lawson - piano, Turkish finger cymbals, 7 Up bottle, balloon, bells
Ernie Farrow - bass, rabat
Oliver Jackson - drums, gong, earthboard

References 

Yusef Lateef albums
1959 albums
Albums produced by Bob Weinstock
Albums recorded at Van Gelder Studio
New Jazz Records albums